Rikka is a form of ikebana.

Rikka can also refer to:

 another term for Lixia in traditional East Asian calendars
 Antonis Rikka, Greek football player
 Rikka Takanashi, a fictional character from the Japanese light novel and anime series, Love, Chunibyo & Other Delusions